The 2023 New Mexico Lobos football team will represent the University of New Mexico as a member of the Mountain West Conference during the 2023 NCAA Division I FBS football season. The Lobos are expected to be led by Danny Gonzales in his fourth year as New Mexico's head coach. They play their home games at University Stadium in Albuquerque, New Mexico.

Offseason

Transfers

Outgoing

Incoming

Schedule

References

New Mexico
New Mexico Lobos football seasons
New Mexico Lobos football